This list of the Cenozoic life of Alabama contains the various prehistoric life-forms whose fossilized remains have been reported from within the US state of Alabama and are between 66 million and 10,000 years of age.

A

 †Abderospira
 †Abderospira aldrichi
 †Abderospira meyeri
 †Abderospira sabina
 †Abdounia
 †Abdounia enniskilleni
 †Abdounia recticona
 Abra
 †Abra nitens
 †Absonocytheropteron
 †Absonocytheropteron watervalleyensis
 †Acanthionella
 †Acanthionella oecioporosa – type locality for species
  Acanthocardia
 †Acanthocardia claibornensis
 †Acanthocardia tuomeyi
 Acanthodesia
 †Acanthodesia savartii
 Accipiter
  †Accipiter striatus
 Acirsa
 †Acirsa gracilior
 Aclis – report made of unidentified related form or using admittedly obsolete nomenclature
 †Aclis modesta
 †Acrocoelum
 †Acrocoelum cancellatum
 †Acropomatidarum – report made of unidentified related form or using admittedly obsolete nomenclature
  Acropora
 †Acropora saillans
 Actaeonema
 †Actaeonema sulcatum
 Acteocina
 †Acteocina commixta
 †Acteocina leai
 Acteon
 †Acteon claibornicola
 †Acteon costellatus
 †Acteon idoneus
 †Acteon pomilius
 †Actinacis
 †Actinacis barretti
 †Actinocyclina
 †Actinocyclina bainbridgensis
 Actinocythereis
 †Actinocythereis gibsonensis
 †Acuticythereis
 †Acuticythereis cocoaensis
 Adeonellopsis
 †Adeonellopsis cyclops – type locality for species
 †Adeonellopsis galeata
 †Adeonellopsis magniporosa – type locality for species
 †Adeonellopsis porosa – type locality for species
 †Adeonellopsis transversa
 †Adeorbis – report made of unidentified related form or using admittedly obsolete nomenclature
 †Adeorbis incertus
 †Adeorbis punctiformis
 Aequipecten
 †Aequipecten cocoana
 †Aequipecten deshayesi
  Aetobatus
  Agaronia
 †Agaronia alabamensis
 †Agaronia bombylis
 †Agaronia mediavia
 †Agomphus
 †Agomphus alabamensis – type locality for species
 Aimulosia
 †Aimulosia clavula – type locality for species
 Alaba
 †Alaba plicatovaricosa
 †Alaba varicifer
 Albula
 †Albula bashiana – or unidentified related form
 †Albulidarum – report made of unidentified related form or using admittedly obsolete nomenclature
 Alderina – tentative report
 †Alderina nodulosa
 †Allomorone – type locality for genus
 †Allomorone burlesonis – type locality for species
  Alopias
 †Alopias latidens
 †Alveinus
 †Alveinus minutus
 Amaura
 †Amaura tombigbeensis
 †Ambigostrea
 †Ambigostrea tecticosta
  †Ambystoma
 †Ambystoma maculotum
 Ampheristus
 Amphiblestrum
 †Amphiblestrum curvatum – type locality for species
 †Ampullina
 †Ampullina recurva
 Amusium
 †Amusium ocalanum
 Anas
 †Anas crecca
  †Anas platyrhynchos
 Ancilla
 †Ancilla staminea
 †Ancilla subglobosa
 Angaria – report made of unidentified related form or using admittedly obsolete nomenclature
 †Angaria concionaria
 Angulus
 †Angulus entaenia
 †Angulus plana
 †Angulus prolenta
 Anodontia
 †Anodontia subvexa
 Anolis
  †Anolis carolinensis
 Anomia
 †Anomia argentaria
 †Anomia ephippioides
 †Anomia hammetti
 †Anomia lisbonensis
 †Anomia navicelloides
 †Anomia taylorensis
  Antalis
 †Antalis arciforme
 †Antalis blandum
 †Antalis minutistriatum
 †Antalis thalloides
 Antropora
 †Antropora damicornis
 †Antropora minuta
 †Antropora pyriforme
 †Antropora pyriformis
 †Antropora recta
 †Antropora rectum
 †Antropora wadei
 Apalone
  †Apalone spinifera
  †Aphelops
 †Aphelops mutilus
 Aplodinotus – tentative report
 †Apogonidarum – report made of unidentified related form or using admittedly obsolete nomenclature
 †Apogonidarum rostrosus – type locality for species
 †Aporolepas
 †Aporolepas howei
  Aporrhais
 †Aporrhais aldrichi
 Aprionodon
 †Aprionodon greyegertoni – type locality for species
 Arca
 †Arca hatchetigbeensis
 Archaeolithothamnium
 †Archicythereis – report made of unidentified related form or using admittedly obsolete nomenclature
 †Archicythereis yazooensis
  Architectonica
 †Architectonica alabamensis
 †Architectonica aldrichi
 †Architectonica alveatum
 †Architectonica amoena
 †Architectonica antrosa
 †Architectonica bellensis
 †Architectonica bimixta
 †Architectonica caelatura
 †Architectonica cossmanni
 †Architectonica cupola
 †Architectonica elaborata
 †Architectonica fungina
 †Architectonica greggi
 †Architectonica huppertzi
 †Architectonica intusa
 †Architectonica johnsoni
 †Architectonica meekana
 †Architectonica ornata
 †Architectonica periscelida
 †Architectonica petrosus
 †Architectonica planiformis
 †Architectonica sabinia
 †Architectonica sylvaerupis
 Arcopagia
 †Arcopagia raveneli
 †Arcopagia trumani
 Arcoscalpellum
 †Arcoscalpellum toulmini – type locality for species
  †Arctodus
 †Arctodus simus
 †Area
 †Area hatchetigbeensis
  Argobuccinum
 †Argobuccinum showalteri
 †Argobuccinum tuomeyi
  Argyrotheca
 †Argyrotheca macneili – type locality for species
 †Ariidarum – report made of unidentified related form or using admittedly obsolete nomenclature
  Astarte
 †Astarte americana
 †Astarte callosa
 †Astarte proruta
 †Astarte triangulata
 †Astarte triangulatoides
 Asthenotoma
 †Asthenotoma strigosa
  Astrangia
 †Astrangia wilcoxensis – type locality for species
 Astyris
 †Astyris crassus
 †Astyris subfaxa – or unidentified comparable form
 †Astyris subfraxa
  Athleta
 †Athleta haleanus
 †Athleta limopsis
 †Athleta lisbonensis
 †Athleta petrosa
 †Athleta rugatus
 †Athleta sayanus
 †Athleta tuomeyi
  Atrina
 †Atrina cawcawensis
 †Atrina jacksoniana
  †Aturia
 †Aturia alabamensis
 Atys
 †Atys claibornensis
 †Atys meyeri
 †Atys robustoides
 Aythya
 †Aythya collaris
 †Aythya valisineria – or unidentified comparable form

B

 Bactridium
 †Bactridium teges
 †Baculites
 Bairdia
 †Bairdia gosportensis – type locality for species
 Bairdoppilata
 †Balanophylla
 †Balanophylla haleana
  Balanophyllia
 †Balanophyllia annularis – type locality for species
 †Balanophyllia augustinensis
 †Balanophyllia demophyllum
 †Balanophyllia desmophyllum
 †Balanophyllia elaborata
 †Balanophyllia haleana
 †Balanophyllia ponderosa – type locality for species
  Balanus
 Balcis
 †Balcis aciculata
 †Balcis claibornia
 †Balcis notata
 †Balcis wheeleri
  †Baluchicardia
 †Baluchicardia greggiana
 †Baluchicardia wilcoxensis
  Barbatia
 †Barbatia aspera
 †Barbatia cuculloides
 †Barbatia lignitifera
 †Barbatia ludoviciana
 Barnea
 †Barnea alatoidea
 Bartramia
  †Bartramia longicauda
  †Basilosaurus
 †Basilosaurus cetoides
 Basterotia
 †Basterotia prima
 †Bathosella
 †Bathosella undata – tentative report
  Bathytoma
 †Bathytoma congesta
 †Bathytoma marieana
 †Bathytoma nonplicata – or unidentified comparable form
 Bathytormus
 †Bathytormus clarkensis
 †Bathytormus flexurus
 †Bathytormus protextus
 †Bauzaia
 †Bauzaia mucronata – type locality for species
 †Bayania
 †Bayania claibornensis
 †Bayania secale
 Beisselina
 †Beisselina trulla
 †Belemnosella
 †Belemnosella floweri
 †Bellatara
 †Bellatara floridana
 †Belosaepia
 †Belosaepia alabamensis
 †Belosaepia harrisi
 †Belosaepia saccaria
 †Belosaepia uncinata
 †Belosaepia ungula
 †Belosaepia veatchi
 Bison
  †Bison antiquus
 Bittium
 †Bittium anita
 †Bittium elegans
 †Bittium estellense
  Blarina
 †Blarina carolinensis
 †Bolis
 †Bolis enterogramma
 †Bolis lisboa
 Bonasa
  †Bonasa umbellus
 †Bonellitia
 †Bonellitia annosa
 †Bonellitia bastropensis
 †Bonellitia elevata
 †Bonellitia graciloides
 †Bonellitia parilis
 †Bonellitia silvaerupis
 †Bonellitia tortiplica
 Bornia
 †Bornia plectopygia
 †Bornia prima
 †Bornia scintillata
 Botula
 †Botula carolinensis
 Brachidontes
 †Brachidontes alabamensis
 †Brachidontes stubbsi
 †Brachycythere
 †Brachycythere martini
 †Brachycythere mississippiensis
 †Brachycythere watervalleyensis
 Brachydontes – tentative report
 Branta
  †Branta canadensis
 †Brazosiella
 †Brazosiella kokeni
 †Brazosiella moseleyi
 †Brissopatagus
 †Brissopatagus alabamensis
 †Bristocorbula
 †Bristocorbula fossata
 †Buffonellaria
 †Buffonellaria entomostoma
 Bufo
   †Bufo americanus
 †Bufo woodhousei
 Bullia
 †Bullia altilis
 †Bullia calli
 †Bullia calluspira
 †Bullia ellipticum
 †Bullia priamopse
 †Bullia scamba
 †Bullia tenera
 †Bullia tuomeyi
 †Bulliopsis
 †Bulliopsis choctavensis
 †Bulovia
 †Bulovia weisbordi – tentative report
 Buntonia
 †Buntonia shubutaensis
 †Burnhamia
  Busycon

C

 Caberea
 †Caberea boryi
 Cadulus
 †Cadulus abruptus
 †Cadulus depressus
 †Cadulus turgidus
 Caestocorbula
 †Caestocorbula fossata
 †Caestocorbula murchisonii
 †Caestocorbula wailesiana
 Callianassa
  Calliostoma
 †Calliostoma claibornianum
 Callista
 †Callista aldrichi
 †Callista annexa
 †Callista lisbonensis
 †Callista perovata
 Callopora
 †Callopora vicina – type locality for species
 Callucina
 †Callucina papyracea
 †Calorhadia
 †Calorhadia aldrichiana
 †Calorhadia bella
 †Calorhadia compsa
 †Calorhadia elongatoidea
 †Calorhadia equalis
 †Calorhadia opulenta
 †Calorhadia pharcida
 †Calorhadia semen
 †Calorhadia semenoides
 Calyptraea
 †Calyptraphorus
 †Calyptraphorus aldrichi
 †Calyptraphorus compressus
 †Calyptraphorus stamineus
 †Calyptraphorus trinodiferus
 †Calyptraphorus velatus
 Campanile
 †Campanile claytonense
  Cancellaria
 †Cancellaria alveata
 †Cancellaria costata
 †Cancellaria panones
 †Cancelrana
 †Cancelrana lanceolata
 Canis
  †Canis rufus
 Cantharus
 †Cantharus elegantissimus
 †Cantharus johnsoni
  Capulus
 †Capulus expansus
  Carcharhinus
 †Carcharhinus gibbesi
  Carcharias
 †Carcharias hopei
 †Carditella
 †Carditella aldrichi
 Cardium – report made of unidentified related form or using admittedly obsolete nomenclature; see Cerastoderma
 †Caricella
 †Caricella bolaris
 †Caricella cherokeensis
 †Caricella claibornensis
 †Caricella demissa
 †Caricella doliata
 †Caricella dolita
 †Caricella heilprini
 †Caricella leana
 †Caricella ludoviciana
 †Caricella podagrina
 †Caricella praetenuis
 †Caricella pyruloides
 †Caricella stenzeli
  Carphophis
 †Carphophis anoenus
 Caryocorbula
 †Caryocorbula coloradoensis
 †Caryocorbula densata
 †Caryocorbula deshayesii
 †Caryocorbula deusseni
 †Caryocorbula willistoni
  Caryophyllia
 †Caryophyllia mcglameryae – type locality for species
  †Castoroides
  †Catenicella
 †Catenicella subseptentrionalis
 Catoptrophorus
  †Catoptrophorus semipalmatus
 Cavilinga
 †Cavilinga amica
 Celleporaria
 †Celleporaria damicornis
 †Celleporaria fissurata
 †Celleporaria granulosa
 †Celleporaria orbiculifera
 †Celleporaria seposita – type locality for species
 Celleporina
 †Celleporina globosa
 †Celleporina umbonata
  Centroberyx
 †Ceriopora
 †Ceriopora vesiculosa
  Cerithiella
 †Cerithiella chamberlaini
 †Cerithiella delicatula
 †Cerithiella fluviatilis
 †Cerithiella nassula
 †Cerithiella preconica
 †Cerithiella regularoides
 †Cerithiella terebropsis
 †Cerithioderma
 †Cerithioderma primum
 Cerithiopsis
 †Cerithiopsis dalli
 †Cerithiopsis greggiensis
 †Cerithiopsis solitaria
  Cerithium – report made of unidentified related form or using admittedly obsolete nomenclature
 †Cerithium agnotum
 †Cerithium claibornense
 †Cerithium tombigbeense
 Cervus
  †Cervus elaphus
 Chama
 †Chama monroensis
  Charonia
 †Charonia showalteri
 Cheiloporina
 †Cheiloporina saillans
  Chiton
 †Chiton eocenensis
 †Chiton prostremus
  Chlamys
 †Chlamys anatipes
 †Chlamys beverlyi
 †Chlamys cainei
 †Chlamys cawcawensis
 †Chlamys chickaria
 †Chlamys choctavensis
 †Chlamys clarkeana
 †Chlamys clinchfieldensis
 †Chlamys danvillensis
 †Chlamys dennisoni
 †Chlamys deshayesi
 †Chlamys deshayesii
 †Chlamys gainstownensis
 †Chlamys glendonensis
 †Chlamys howei
 †Chlamys mcquirti
 †Chlamys nupera
 †Chlamys spillmani
 †Chlamys wahtubbeana
 †Chlorophthalmidarum – report made of unidentified related form or using admittedly obsolete nomenclature
 †Chlorophthalmidarum postangulatus – type locality for species
  †Chlorophthalmus – report made of unidentified related form or using admittedly obsolete nomenclature
 †Chlorophthalmus postangulatus – type locality for species
 Chrysemys
  †Chrysemys picta
 †Chrysodomus – report made of unidentified related form or using admittedly obsolete nomenclature
 †Chrysodomus striatus
  Cibicides
 †Cibicides lobatulus
  Cidaris
 †Cidaris pratti
 †Cidaris spendens – or unidentified related form
 †Cidaris splendens
 †Cimomia
 †Cimomia haltomi
 †Cimomia subrecta
 †Cimomia vaughani
 †Cirsochilus
 †Cirsochilus claibornense
 †Cirsochilus lineatum
 Cirsotrema
 †Cirsotrema claibornense
 †Cirsotrema creolum
 †Cirsotrema danvillense
 †Cirsotrema linteum
 †Cirsotrema nassulum
 †Cirsotrema ranellinum
 Clava – or unidentified comparable form
 †Clava globoleve
 Clavatula – report made of unidentified related form or using admittedly obsolete nomenclature
 †Clavatula tupis
  Clavilithes
 †Clavilithes hubbardanus
 †Clavilithes humerosus
 †Clavilithes kennedyanus
 †Clavilithes pachyleurus
 †Clavilithes penrosei
 †Clavilithes protextus
 †Clavilithes raphanoides
 †Clavilithes samsoni
 Clavus
 †Clavus lonsdallii
 †Clavus pulchreconcha
 †Clavus solitariuscula
 †Clavus surculopsis
 Cliona
 †Cliona microtuberum
 Clithrocytheridea
 †Clithrocytheridea caldwellensis
 †Clithrocytheridea garretti
 †Clithrocytheridea grigsbyi
 †Clithrocytheridea shubutensis
 Closia
 †Closia larvata
 †Closia plicata
 †Closia semen
  Clypeaster
 †Clypeaster rogersi
  Cochlespira
 †Cochlespira bella
 †Cochlespira engonata
 †Cochlespira greggi
 †Cochlespirella
 †Cochlespirella nana
  Codakia – tentative report
 †Codakia claytonia
 †Codakia symmetrica
 Colinus
  †Colinus virginianus
 Coluber
  †Coluber constrictor
 Columbellopsis
 †Columbellopsis elevata
 †Columbellopsis mississippiensis
 †Congeris
 †Congeris brevior
 †Congridarum – report made of unidentified related form or using admittedly obsolete nomenclature
 Conomitra
 †Conomitra fusoides
 †Conomitra texana
 †Conomitra traceyi
 Conopeum
 †Conopeum arborescens
 †Conopeum similior – type locality for species
 †Conopeum wilcoxianicum – type locality for species
 †Conorbis
 †Conorbis conoides
  Conus
 †Conus granopsis
 †Conus improvidus
 †Conus sauridens
 †Conus smithvillensis
 †Coptostoma
 †Coptostoma rameum
 Coralliophaga
 †Coralliophaga claibornensis
 †Coralliophaga prima
  Corbicula – tentative report
 †Corbicula cornelliana
  Corbula
 †Corbula alabamiensis
 †Corbula compressa
 †Corbula concha
 †Corbula extenuata
 †Corbula milium
 †Corbula subcompressa
 Cordieria
 †Cordieria biconica
 †Cordieria ludoviciana
  †Cormohipparion
 †Cormohipparion emsliei
 †Cornulina
 †Cornulina armigera
 †Cornulina hatchetigbeensis
 †Cornulina minax
 †Cornulina philadelphica
 †Coronia
 †Coronia alternata
 †Coronia casteri
 †Coronia childreni
 †Coronia lancea
 †Coronia lerchi
 †Coronia margaritosa
 †Coronia mediavia
 †Coronia nodoidea
 †Coronina
 †Coronina childreni
 †Corvina
 †Corvina gemma
 †Corvina intermedia
 Corvus
  †Corvus corax
   †Coryphodon
 Costacallista
 †Costacallista aequorea
 †Costacallista aldrichi
 †Costacallista mortoni
 †Costazzia
 †Costazzia antiqua – type locality for species
 †Crasinella
 †Crasinella minor
 Crassatella
 †Crassatella alta
 †Crassatella aquiana
 †Crassatella gabbi
 †Crassatella ioannes
 †Crassatella sepulcollis
 †Crassatella texalta
 †Crassatella trapaquara
 †Crassatella trapoquara
 †Crassatella tumidula
 Crassinella
 †Crassinella minor
  Crassostrea
 †Crassostrea alabamiensis
 Crenella
 †Crenella isocardioides
 †Crenella latifrons
 †Crenella margaritacea
 Crenilabium
 †Crenilabium cossmanni
 Crepidula
 †Crepidula dumosa
 †Crepidula lirata
 Creseis
 †Creseis elba
 †Creseis nimba
 †Cricella
 †Cricella leana
  Crisia
 †Crisia hornesi
 Crisulipora
 †Crisulipora grandipora – type locality for species
 †Crisulipora promineus
 †Crisulipora rugosodorsalis
  †Crommium
 †Crommium perovatum
 †Crommium tombigbeense
 Crotalus
  †Crotalus horridus
 Cryptobranchus
  †Cryptobranchus alleganiensis
 †Cryptochorda
 †Cryptochorda clarkensis
 †Cryptochorda mohri
 †Cubitostrea
 †Cubitostrea divaricata
 †Cubitostrea lisbonensis
 †Cubitostrea perplicata
 †Cubitostrea sellaeformis
 †Cubitostrea smithvillensis
  Cucullaea
 †Cucullaea gigantea
 †Cucullaea macrodonta
 †Cucullaea saffordi
 †Cucullaria
 †Cucullaria aldrichi
 †Cucullaria ozarkensis
 Cultellus
 †Cultellus conradi
 Cuna
 †Cuna monroensis
 †Cuna parva
 †Cuneocorbula
 †Cuneocorbula subengonata
 Cushmanidea
 †Cushmanidea keyserensis
 †Cushmanidea papula
 †Cushmanidea serangodes
 Cuspidaria
 †Cuspidaria attenuata
 †Cuspidaria prima
 †Cyamocytheridea
 †Cyamocytheridea watervallensis
  Cyanocitta
 †Cyanocitta cristata
 Cyathoseris
 †Cyathoseris formosa
 †Cyathoseris valmondasiaca – tentative report
 †Cyclaster
 †Cyclaster drewryensis – type locality for species
 Cyclicopora
 †Cyclicopora colum
 †Cyclicopora filifera
 †Cyclicopora spongiopsis
 Cyclostremiscus
 †Cyclostremiscus – type locality for species informal
 †Cyclostremiscus dalli
 †Cyclostremiscus exacuus
 †Cyclostremiscus sylvaerupis
 Cygnus
 Cylichna
 †Cylichna acrotoma
 †Cylichna dekayi
 †Cylichna meyeri
 †Cylindracanthus
 †Cylindracanthus acus
 †Cylindracanthus rectus
 Cyllene – or unidentified comparable form
 †Cyllene bellana
 †Cymatholcus
 †Cymatholcus schucherti – type locality for species
  †Cynthiacetus
 †Cynthiacetus maxwelli
  Cypraea
 Cypraedia
 †Cypraedia gilberti
 †Cypraeorbis
 †Cypraeorbis alabamensis
 †Cypraeorbis nuculoides
 †Cypropterina
 †Cypropterina transovuloides
 †Cythereis – tentative report
 †Cythereis collei
 †Cythereis gosportensis – type locality for species
 †Cythereis longicostata – type locality for species
 Cytherella
 Cytherelloidea
 †Cytherelloidea cocoaensis
 †Cytherelloidea montgomeryensis
 Cytheretta
 †Cytheretta alexanderi
 †Cytherideis
 †Cytherideis alta – type locality for species
 †Cytherideis gosportensis – type locality for species
 †Cytherideis perforata – type locality for species
 †Cytheriopsis
 †Cytheriopsis hydana
 Cytheromorpha
 †Cytheromorpha calva
 Cytheropteron
 †Cytheropteron montgomeryensis
 †Cytheropteron variosum
 Cytherura
 †Cytherura semireticulata – type locality for species
 †Cytherura ultra – type locality for species

D

 Daphnella
 †Daphnella gregorioi
  Dasyatis
  Dasypus
 †Dasypus bellus
  Dendrophyllia
 †Dendrophyllia dendrophylloides
 †Dendrophyllia lisbonensis – type locality for species
 Dentalina
 Dentalium
 †Dentalium annulatum
 †Dentalium blandum
 †Dentalium eugenii
 †Dentalium jacksonense
 †Dentalium mediaviense
 †Dentalium microstria
 †Dentalium minutis
 †Dentalium minutistriatum
 †Dentalium multannulatum
 †Dentalium nediaviense
 †Dentalium sylvaerupis
 †Dentalium thalloides
 †Dentiterebra
 †Dentiterebra prima
 Desmeplagioecia
 †Desmeplagioecia compressa
 Desmognathus
  †Desmognathus ochrophaeus
 †Dhondtichlamys
 †Dhondtichlamys greggi
 Diadophis
  †Diadophis punctatus
 Diaperoecia
 †Diaperoecia clava
 †Diaperoecia rugosa – type locality for species
 †Diaperoecia walcotti – type locality for species
 †Diastopora
 †Diastopora magnipora
 Dichocoenia
 †Dichocoenia alabamensis – type locality for species
 Didymosella
 †Didymosella crassa
 †Dinematichthys
 †Dinematichthys midwayensis – type locality for species
  †Dinohyus
 †Dinohyus hollandi – or unidentified related form
  Diodon – tentative report
  Diodora
 †Diodora alabama
 †Diodora mauryi
 †Diodora mediavia
 †Diodora tenebrosa
 †Diodora unilineata
 Diplodonta
 †Diplodonta corbiscula
 †Diplodonta hopkinsensis
 †Diplodonta inflata
 †Diplodonta nana
 †Diplodonta ungulina
 †Diplopholeos
 †Diplopholeos lineatum
 †Dirocerithium
 †Dirocerithium vinctum
 †Dirocerithium whitfieldi
 †Discocyclina
 †Discocyclina weaveri
 Discorbis
 †Discorbis hemisphaerica
 †Discotrochus
 †Discotrochus orbigianus
 †Discotrochus orbignianus
 Distorsio
 †Distorsio septemdenta
 †Ditremaster
 †Ditremaster beckeri
 †Dolicholatirus – tentative report
 †Dolicholatirus interstriatus
 †Dolicholatirus tombigbeensis
 †Doliocassis
 †Doliocassis nupera
 Donax
 †Donax acutangula
 Dorsanum
 †Dorsanum bellaliratum
 Dosinia – tentative report
 †Dosiniopsis
 †Dosiniopsis lenticularis
 Dumetella
  †Dumetella carolinensis

E
 

 †Eburneopecten
 †Eburneopecten corneoides
 †Eburneopecten hamiltonensis
 †Eburneopecten scintillatus
 †Echanthus
 †Echanthus georgiensis
 Echinocyamus
 †Echinocyamus macneili
 †Echinocyamus nacneili
 Echinocythereis
 †Echinocythereis jacksonensis
 Echinolampas
 †Echinolampas aldrichi
 †Echinolampus
 †Echinolampus aldrichi
  †Echinopsis – tentative report
 †Ectopistes
  †Ectopistes migratorius
 †Egerella
 †Egerella elimatula
 †Egerella limatula
 †Egerella subtrigonia
 †Egertonia
 †Egertonia isodonta
  Elaphe
 †Elaphe guttata – or unidentified comparable form
 †Elaphe vulpina
  †Elimia
 †Elimia sylvaerupsis
 †Elimia trigemmata
  Emarginula
 †Emarginula arata
 Endopachys – type locality for genus
 †Endopachys claibornensis – type locality for species
 †Endopachys lonsdale
 †Endopachys lonsdalei – type locality for species
 †Endopachys maclurii
 †Enoploclytia
 †Enoploclytia tumimanus
 Enoplostomella
 †Enoplostomella crassimuralis
 †Enoplostomella defixa
 †Enoplostomella lingulifera – type locality for species
 †Enoplostomella rhomboidalis
 †Enoplostomella vallata
 †Entalophora
 Entosolenia
 †Entosolenia laevigata
 †Eoclathurella
 †Eoclathurella meridionalis
 †Eocypraea
 †Eocypraea eosmithi
 †Eocypraea estellensis
 †Eodrilla
 †Eodrilla depygis
 †Eodrilla lonsdalei
 †Eodrilla texana
 †Eodrilla texanopsis
 †Eodrillia
 †Eodrillia depygis
 †Eodrillia lonsdalii
 †Eophysema
 †Eophysema ozarkana
 †Eophysema subvexa
 †Eopleurotoma
 †Eopleurotoma bimoniata
 †Eopleurotoma cainei
 †Eopleurotoma cochlea
 †Eopleurotoma desnoyersii
 †Eopleurotoma gemmavia
 †Eopleurotoma hoeninghausii
 †Eopleurotoma lisboncola
 †Eopleurotoma nodocarinata
 †Eopleurotoma nupera
 †Eopleurotoma rugatina
 †Eopleurotoma rugosa
 †Eopleurotoma sayi
 †Eopleurotoma thyroidifera
 †Eopleurotoma veatchi
 †Eosinica
 †Eosinica elevata
 †Eosurcula
 †Eosurcula beaumontii
 †Eosurcula lesueurii
 †Eosurcula moorei
 †Eosurcula pulcherrima
 †Eosurcula sanctimauritii
 †Eosurcula superpons
 †Eosurcula tardereperta
 †Eosurcula tuomeyi
  †Epicyon
 †Epicyon haydeni – or unidentified comparable form
 Epilucina
 †Epilucina rotunda
  Epitonium
 †Epitonium exquisitum
 †Epitonium mcglameriae
 †Epitonium multiliniferum
 †Epitonium munistriatum
 †Epitonium subacutum
 †Epitonium vetustum
 Eptesicus
  †Eptesicus fuscus
 Equus
 Ervilia
 †Ervilia lignitica
 †Ervilia meyeri
 Erycina
 †Erycina plicatula
 †Erycina whitfieldi
 †Etyus
 †Etyus buccata
 †Etyus magniporosa
 †Etyus strangulata
 †Eucheilodon
 †Eucheilodon reticulata
  Eulima
 †Eulima cainei
 †Eulima extremis
 Eulimella – report made of unidentified related form or using admittedly obsolete nomenclature
 †Eulimella propenotata
 Eupatagus
 †Eupatagus antillarum
 Eupleura
 †Eupleura morula
 †Eurhodia
 †Eurhodia patelliformis
 †Euritina
 †Euritina tecta
  †Eurycea
 Eurytellina
 †Eurytellina linifera
 †Eurytellina mooreana – tentative report
 †Eurytellina papyria
 †Eurytellina vaughani
 †Euscalpellum
 †Euscalpellum eocenense
  Euspira
 †Euspira aldrichi
 †Euspira leana
 †Euspira marylandica
 †Euspira newtonensis
 †Euspira perspecta
 †Euspira sabina
  Euthria
 †Euthria dubia
 †Eutrephoceras
 †Eutrephoceras johnsoni
 †Eutrephoceras jonesi – type locality for species
 Evalea
 †Evalea bartschi
 †Evalea melanella
 †Exilia
 †Exilia pergracilis
 †Exilifusus
 †Exilifusus thalloides
 †Exochoecia
 †Exochoecia rugosa – type locality for species
 †Exogyra
 †Exogyra costata

F

 Falco
  †Falco sparverius
 Falsifusus
 †Falsifusus harrisi
 †Falsifusus ludlovicianus
 †Falsifusus ottonis
 †Falsifusus subfilosus
 Fibularia
 †Fibularia alabamensis
 †Ficopsis
 †Ficopsis penita
 †Ficopsis texana
 Filisparsa
 †Filisparsa bini – type locality for species
 †Filisparsa biseriata
 †Filisparsa gracilis – type locality for species
 †Filisparsa ingens
 †Filisparsa laxata – type locality for species
 †Filisparsa typica
 Fimbria
 †Fimbria lirata
 †Fimbria undata
 †Fimbria urdata
  Fissurella
 Flabellum
 †Flabellum conoideum – type locality for species
 †Flabellum cuneiforme
 †Flabellum johnsoni – type locality for species
 †Flabellum magnocostatum
 †Flabellum matthewsense
 †Flabellum pachyphyllum
 †Flabellum wailesii
 †Flabellum wallesii
 Floridina
 †Floridina antiqua
 Floridinella
 †Floridinella vicksburgica
 Fulgurofusus
 †Fulgurofusus quercollis
 †Fulgurofusus rugatus
 Fusimitra
 †Fusimitra millingtoni
 †Fusimitra perexilis
 †Fusimitra polita
 †Fusitoma
 †Fusitoma sipha
 Fustiaria
 †Fustiaria danai

G

 †Gagaria
 †Gagaria chickasawhay – type locality for species
 †Gagaria salis – tentative report
  Galeocerdo
 †Galeocerdo alabamensis – type locality for species
 †Galeocerdo clarkensis – type locality for species
 †Galeocerdo latidens
 Galeodea
 †Galeodea brevidentata
 †Galeodea dubia
 †Galeodea koureos
  Galeorhinus
 †Galeorhinus falconeri – or unidentified comparable form
 †Galeorhinus recticonus
 Gari
 †Gari blainvillii
 †Gari claibornense
 †Gari ebora
 †Gari eborea
 †Gari filosum
 †Gari harrisi
 †Gari ozarkana
 †Gari smithi
 †Gastopoda
 Gastrochaena
 †Gastrochaena larva
 †Gastrochaena striatula
 Gavia
  †Gavia immer
 Gegania
 †Gegania antiquata
 Gemma
 †Gemma sanctimauricensis
 †Genartina
 †Genartina texana
 Genota
 †Genota gardnerae
 †Genota gardneri
 †Genota heilprini
 Geodia
  †Georgiacetus
 †Georgiacetus vogtlensis
 Gephyrotes
 †Gephyrotes quadriserialis
 Gibbolucina
 †Gibbolucina pandata
  †Gigantostrea
 †Gigantostrea sylvaerupis
 †Gigantostrea trigonalis
 †Gilbertia
 †Gilbertia estellensis
 †Gilbertina
 †Gilbertina estellensis
  Ginglymostoma
 †Ginglymostoma blankenhorni – or unidentified comparable form
 †Ginglymostoma serra
 †Gitolampas
 †Gitolampas georgiensis
 Glossus
 †Glossus mediavia
 †Gluttulina – tentative report
 †Gluttulina irregularis
  Glycymeris
 †Glycymeris aviculoides
 †Glycymeris filosa
 †Glycymeris idonea
 †Glycymeris lisbonensis
 †Glycymeris minor
 †Glycymeris staminea
 †Glycymeris trigonella
 Glyptoactis
 †Glyptoactis alticostata
 †Glyptoactis nasuta
 †Glyptoactis sillimani
 †Glyptoactis trapaquara
 †Glyptostyla
 †Glyptostyla bacula
 †Glyptotoma
 †Glyptotoma conradiana
  Goniopora
 †Goniopora aldrichi – type locality for species
 †Grammella
 †Grammella pusilla – type locality for species
 †Graphularia
 Graptemys
  †Graptemys geographica
 †Grateloupia
 †Grateloupia hydana
 Grus
 †Gryphaeostrea
 †Gryphaeostrea plicatella
 †Gryphaeostrea vomer
 Gyroidina
 †Gyroidina soldanii

H

 †Hadralucina – tentative report
 †Hadralucina augustana
 †Haimesiastraea – type locality for genus
 †Haimesiastraea conferta – type locality for species
 Haliaeetus
 †Haliaeetus leucocephalus – or unidentified comparable form
 Haliris
 †Haliris granuloides
 †Hamimesiastraea
 †Hamimesiastraea coniferta
 †Hamulus
 †Hamulus onyx
 Haplocytheridea
 †Haplocytheridea goochi
 †Haplocytheridea montgomeryensis
  Hastula
 †Hastula houstonia
 †Hastula venusta
 Haustator
 †Haustator carinata
 †Haustator perdita
 †Haustator rina
 Hemiaster
 †Hemiaster moscovensis – type locality for species
  Hemipristis
 †Hemipristis curvatus
 †Hemipristis wyattdurhami – type locality for species
 †Hemisurcula
 †Hemisurcula silicata
 Henryhowella
 †Henryhowella florienensis
 †Hercoglossa
 †Hercoglossa mcglameryae
 †Hercoglossa orbiculata
 †Hercoglossa ulrichi
 †Hercoglossa walteri
 Hermanites – tentative report
 †Hermanites dohmi
 †Hermanites hysonensis
 †Herpetopora
 †Herpetopora danica
 †Hesperiturris – tentative report
 †Hesperiturris nodocarinatus
 Heterodon
  †Heterodon platirhinos – or unidentified comparable form
  Heterodontus
 †Heterodontus woodwardi – or unidentified comparable form
  Hexaplex
 †Hexaplex colei
 †Hexaplex engonatus – type locality for species
 †Hexaplex vanuxemi
 Hincksina
 †Hincksina costulifera – type locality for species
 †Hincksina elegans – type locality for species
 †Hincksina jacksonica
 †Hindsiella
 †Hindsiella faba
 Hippomenella
 †Hippomenella capitimortis
 †Hippomenella costulata
 †Hippomenella crassicollis
 †Hippomenella pungens – type locality for species
 †Hippomenella transversa
  Hipponix
 †Hipponix pygmaeus
 †Hipponix sylvaerupis
 †Hipponix vagus
 Hippopleurifera
 †Hippopleurifera costulata
 †Hippopleurifera crassicollis
 †Hippopleurifera incondita
 †Hippopleurifera moodysbranchensis
 †Hippopleurifera rotula
 Hippoporella
 †Hippoporella perforata – type locality for species
 Hippoporina
 †Hippoporina lucens
 †Hippoporina midwayaica
 Hyla
  †Hyla gratiosa
 †Hyposaurus
 †Hyposaurus rogersii
 †Hypotodus
 †Hypotodus robustus

I

 Idmonea
 †Idmonea grallator
 †Idmonea milneana
 †Idmonea petri
 †Idmonea triforata
  Isognomon
 †Isognomon cornelliana

J

 †Jaekelotodus
 †Jaekelotodus trigonalis
 †Jefitchia
 †Jefitchia copelandi
 Jupiteria
 †Jupiteria jonesi
 †Jupiteria smirna

K

 †Kapalmerella
 †Kapalmerella arenicola
 †Kapalmerella dumblei
 †Kapalmerella mortoni
 †Kapalmerella pleboides
 Katherinella
 †Katherinella trigoniata
 †Katherinella trinitatis
 †Keilostoma
 †Keilostoma mediavia
 †Kleidionella
 †Kleidionella grandis
 †Konarocythere
 †Konarocythere spurgeonae
  Kuphus
 †Kuphus incrassatus

L

 Lacazella
 †Lacazella nana – type locality for species
 Lacerna
 †Lacerna hexagonalis
 †Lacinia
 †Lacinia alveata
 †Lacinia claibornensis
 †Lacunaria
 †Lacunaria alabamiensis
 †Lacunaria erecta
 †Laevibuccinum
 †Laevibuccinum constrictum
 †Laevibuccinum harrisi
 †Laevibuccinum lineatum
 †Laevibuccinum popleum
 †Laevibuccinum prorsum
  Laevicardium
 Laganum
 †Laganum floridanum
 †Lagonoecia
 †Lagonoecia lamellifera – type locality for species
 Lamarckina
  Lamna
 †Lamna lerichei
 †Lamna mediavia – type locality for species
   Lampropeltis
 †Lampropeltis getulus
 †Lampropeltis triangulum
 †Lapparia
 †Lapparia mooreana
 †Lapparia pactilis
  Latirus
 †Latirus biplicatus
 †Latirus elaboratus
 †Latirus extricatus
 †Latirus interstriatus
 †Latirus moorei
 †Latirus plicatus
 †Latirus tepus
 †Ledina
 †Ledina smirna
 †Leiorhinus
 †Leiorhinus prorutus
 Leiosella
 †Leiosella grandisora – type locality for species
 †Leiosella rostrifera
 Lenticulina
 †Lepidocyclina
 †Lepidocyclina mantelli
 †Lepidocyclina undosa – or unidentified comparable form
 Lepton
 †Lepton vaughani
 †Levifusus
 †Levifusus alveata
 †Levifusus bellanus
 †Levifusus bispinosus
 †Levifusus dalei
 †Levifusus dallianus
 †Levifusus irrasus
 †Levifusus mortonii
 †Levifusus mortoniopsis
 †Levifusus pagodiformis
 †Levifusus prepagoda
 †Levifusus regularoides
 †Levifusus supraplanus
 †Levifusus suteri
 †Levifusus trabeatus
 Lichenopora
 †Lichenopora goldfussi
 †Lichenopora grignonensis
 †Lichenopora prolifera
  Limacina
 †Limacina choctavensis
 †Limacina elongatoidea
  Limaria
 †Limaria ozarkana
 Limopsis
 †Limopsis aviculoides
 Linga
 †Linga alveata
 †Linga carinifera
 †Linga pomilia
 †Linga smithi
 †Linthia
 †Linthia alabamensis – type locality for species
  †Linuparus
 †Linuparus wilcoxensis
 †Lirodiscus
 †Lirodiscus jacksonensis
 †Lirodiscus mediavia
 †Lirodiscus protractus
 †Lirodiscus scutellarius
 †Lirodiscus smithvillensis
 †Lirodiscus tellinoides
 †Lirofusus
 †Lirofusus subtenuis
 †Lirofusus thoracicus
 †Lisbonia
 †Lisbonia expansa
  Lithophaga
 †Lithophaga claibornensis
 †Lithophaga gainesensis
 †Lithophaga nigra – or unidentified related form
 †Lithophaga petricoloides
  Lithophyllum – tentative report
 †Lithophysema
 †Lithoporella
  Lithothamnion – tentative report
 †Litorhadia
 †Litorhadia acala
 †Litorhadia aldrichiana
 †Litorhadia elongatoidea
 †Litorhadia mater
  Longchaeus
 †Longchaeus larvata
  Lopha
 †Lopha vicksburgensis
 †Lophoranina
 †Lophoranina georgiana
 Loxoconcha
 †Loxoconcha clarkensis – type locality for species
 †Loxoconcha cocoaensis
 †Loxoconcha concentrica
 †Loxoconcha creolensis
 †Loxoconcha jacksonensis
 †Loxoconcha stavensis – type locality for species
 †Loxoconcha watervalleyensis
 Lucina
 †Lucina carinifera
 †Lucina dolabra
 †Lucina fortidentalis
 †Lucina hamata
 †Lucina papyracea
 †Lucina pomilia
 †Lucina primoidea
 †Lucina sylvaerupis
 Lunularia
 †Lunularia claibornica
 †Lunularia distans
 †Lunularia ovata
 †Lunularia verrucosa – type locality for species
 Lunulites
 †Lunulites bouei
 †Lunulites distans
 †Lunulites jacksonensis
 †Lunulites truncata
 Lynx
  †Lynx rufus
 Lyria
 †Lyria lyroidea
 †Lyria wilcoxiana
 †Lyrodiscus
 †Lyrodiscus smithvillensis
 †Lyropecten
 †Lyropecten duncanensis
 †Lyrosurcula
 †Lyrosurcula dalli
 †Lyrosurcula funiculigera
 †Lyrosurcula sexvaricosa
 †Lyrosurcula shaleri
 †Lyrosurcula sylvaerupis

M

  Macoma
 †Macoma danai
 †Macoma scandula
 †Macoma sillimani
 Macrocallista
 †Macrocallista sylvaerupis
 Macropneustes
 †Macropneustes mortoni
 †Mactropsis
 †Mactropsis aequorea
 †Mactropsis rectilinearis
 Madracis
 †Madracis ganei
 †Madracis gregorioi – type locality for species
 †Madracis gregoriori
 †Madracis herricki
 †Mammut
  †Mammut americanum
 †Mammuthus
  †Mammuthus columbi
 Margaretta
 †Margaretta parviporosa
 †Margaretta vicksburgia – type locality for species
 †Margaretta vicksburgica – type locality for species
  Marginella
 †Marginella constricta
 †Marginella constrictoides
 †Marginella silabra
 Martesia
 †Martesia elongata
 †Martesia recurva
 †Mastigophora
 †Mastigophora hyndmanni
 †Mathilda
 †Mathilda claibornesis
 †Mathilda elongatoides
 †Mathilda leana
 †Mathilda leona
 †Mathilda singularis
 †Mazzalina
 †Mazzalina inaurata
 †Mazzalina plena
 †Mazzalina tuomeyi
 Mecynoecia
 †Mecynoecia cornuta – type locality for species
 †Mecynoecia elongatobula
 †Mecynoecia elongatotubre
 †Mecynoecia lunata
 †Mecynoecia proboscidea
 †Mecynoecia quisenberryae
 †Mecynoecia semota
  †Megalonyx
 †Megalonyx jeffersonii
  Melanella
 Melanerpes
  †Melanerpes carolinus – or unidentified comparable form
  Melanopsis
 †Melanopsis anita
 Meleagris
  †Meleagris gallopavo
 †Membranioporella – tentative report
 †Membranioporella subgossizi – type locality for species
 Membranipora
 †Membranipora arcana – type locality for species
 †Membranipora tubulosa – type locality for species
 Membraniporella – tentative report
 Membraniporidra
 †Membraniporidra similis
 †Membraniporidra spissimuralis
 †Membraniporina
 †Membraniporina sinesolum
 †Mercimonia – tentative report
 †Mercimonia mercenaroidea
 Meretrix
 †Meretrix ripleyana
  Mergus
  Mesalia
 †Mesalia alabamiensis
 †Mesalia allentonensis
 †Mesalia biplicata
 †Mesalia bowlesi
 †Mesalia claibornensis
 †Mesalia persa
 †Mesalia pumila
 †Mesalia vetusta
 †Mesalia watsonensis
 †Mesomorpha
 †Mesomorpha duncani – type locality for species
  Mesophyllum
 †Mesorhytis
 †Mesorhytis hatchetigbeensis
 †Metradolium
 †Metradolium transversum
 Metrarabdotos
 †Metrarabdotos grande – type locality for species
 †Metrarabdotos moniliferum
 Metula
 †Metula sylvaerupis
 †Michela
 †Michela trabeatoides
 †Micrancilla
 †Micrancilla alibamasiana – type locality for species
 Microdrillia
 †Microdrillia infans
 †Microdrillia robustula
 †Microdrillia rostratula
 †Microdrillia turriculata
 Microecia
 †Microecia hirta
 †Microecia vibrio
 Micromeris
 †Micromeris minutissima
 Micropora
 †Micropora coriacea
 Microtus
  †Microtus pennsylvanicus
 Miltha
 †Miltha claibornensis
 †Miltha gaufia
 †Miltha greggi
 †Miltha pandata
 Miodontiscus – or unidentified comparable form
 †Miodontiscus aldrichianus
 †Miodontiscus timothii
 Mitrella
 †Mitrella alabamensis
 †Mitrella bucciniformis
 †Mitrella erecta
 †Mitrella parva
 Mitrolumna
 †Mitrolumna eocenensis
 Mnestia
 †Mnestia dekayi
 Modiolaria
 †Modiolaria alabamensis
 Modiolus
 †Modiolus cretaceus
 †Modiolus saffordi
 †Monoceratina
 †Monoceratina alexanderi
 †Monoptygma
 †Monoptygma curtum
 †Monoptygma leai
 †Monoptygma lymneoides
 Montacuta
 †Montacuta bicuspidata
 †Montacuta claiborniana
 †Montacuta herberti
 †Multiporina
 †Multiporina parvipora – type locality for species
  Murex
 †Murex fusates
 †Murex gosportensis
 †Murex migus
 †Murex septemnarius
 Murexiella
 †Murexiella crispangula – type locality for species
 †Murexiella mantelli – type locality for species
 †Murotriton
 †Murotriton grassator
 †Murotriton mcglameriae
  Myliobatis
  †Mylohyus
 †Mylohyus fossilis
 Myotis
  †Myotis lucifugus
 Myrtea
 †Myrtea astartiformis
 †Myrtea bisculpta
 †Myrtea ulrichi
 Mysella
 †Mysella dalli
 †Mysella minuta

N

  †Nannippus
 †Nannippus aztecus
 †Nannippus lenticularis – or unidentified comparable form
 †Nanohalus
 †Nanohalus cossmanni
 Narona
 †Narona greggi
 †Narona quercollis
  Nassarius
 †Nassarius exilis
 Natica
 †Natica aperta
 †Natica gilberti
 †Natica magnoumbilicata
 †Natica mediavia
 †Natica onusta
 †Natica permunda
 †Natica reversa
 †Natica saffordia
  Naticarius
 †Naticarius reversa
 †Naticarius semilunata
  Nebrius
  Negaprion
 †Negaprion gibbsi
 Nellia
 †Nellia bifaciata
 †Nellia midwayanica
 †Nellia tenella
  †Nemipterus
 †Nemipterus caribbaeus – type locality for species
 Nemocardium
 †Nemocardium gambrinum
 †Nemocardium harrisi
 †Nemocardium lene
 †Nemocardium nicolletti
  †Neohipparion
 †Neohipparion eurystyle
 Neotoma
  †Neotoma floridana
  Neritina
 †Neritina unidenta
  Nerodia
 †Nerodia sipeodon
 Neverita
 †Neverita limula
 Niso
 †Niso umbilicata
 Nodosaria
 Nonion
 †Nonion planatum
 Nonionella
 †Nonionella hantekeni
 Norrisia
 †Norrisia micromphala
 †Norrisia nautiloides
 †Norrisia nitens
 †Norrisia parva
 Nucleolites
 †Nucleolites conradi
 †Nucleolites gouldii
 †Nucleopsis
 †Nucleopsis subvaricata
 Nucula
 †Nucula capsiopsis
 †Nucula magnifica
 †Nucula mauricensis
 †Nucula mediavia
 †Nucula monroensis
 †Nucula ovula
 †Nucula potomacensis
 †Nucula ripae
 †Nucula sphenopsis
 Nuculana
 †Nuculana bella
 †Nuculana coelata
 †Nuculana coelatella – tentative report
 †Nuculana corpulentoides
 †Nuculana crassiparva
 †Nuculana fiski
 †Nuculana magna
 †Nuculana marieana
 †Nuculana milamensis
 †Nuculana multilineata
 †Nuculana ozarkola
 †Nuculana plana
 †Nuculana saffordana
 †Nuculana trumani
 †Nuculana wautubbeana
 Nycticeius
  †Nycticeius humeralis

O

  Oculina – type locality for genus
 †Oculina alabamensis – type locality for species
 †Oculina smithi – type locality for species
 †Oculina wagneriana – type locality for species
 Odocoileus
  †Odocoileus virginianus
  Odontaspis
 †Odontaspis hopei
 †Odontaspis macrota
 †Odontaspis malletiana – type locality for species
 †Odontaspis speyeri
 †Odontaspis verticalis – tentative report
 †Odontogryphaea
 †Odontogryphaea thirsae
 †Odontopolys
 †Odontopolys compsorhytis
 †Odontopolys sublevis
  Odostomia
 †Odostomia insignifica
 †Odostomia laevis
 †Odostomia matthewsensis
 †Oligopygus
 †Oligopygus haldemani
 †Oligopygus rotundus
 Oliva
 †Oliva platonica
 Olivella
 †Olivella mediavia
 †Olivella semilignitica
 Oncousoecia
 †Oncousoecia quinqueseriata
 †Oncousoecia varians
 Opheodrys
  †Opheodrys aestivus
 †Orthosurcula
 †Orthosurcula adeona
 †Orthosurcula indenta
 †Orthosurcula langdoni
 †Orthosurcula longipersa
 †Orthosurcula persa
 Orthoyoldia
 †Orthoyoldia psammotaea
 †Oryctomya – or unidentified comparable form
 †Oryctomya prima
  Ostrea
 †Ostrea arrosis
 †Ostrea crenulimarginata
 †Ostrea falco
 †Ostrea glauconoides
 †Ostrea intermedoides
 †Ostrea johnsoni
 †Ostrea ludoviciana
 †Ostrea pulaskensis
 †Ostrea selaeformis
 †Ostrea sinuosa
 Otionella
 †Otionella perforata
  †Otodus
 †Otodus angustidens
 †Otostomia
 †Otostomia melanella
 Otus
   †Otus asio
 Ovulactaeon
 †Ovulactaeon aldrichi
 †Oxyrhina
 †Oxyrhina praecursor

P

 †Pachecoa
 †Pachecoa catonis
 †Pachecoa decisa
 †Pachecoa declivis
 †Pachecoa ellipsis
 †Pachecoa ledoides
 †Pachecoa lisbonensis
 †Pachecoa microcancellata
 †Pachecoa ovalis
 †Pachecoa pectuncularis
 †Pachecoa perplana
 †Pachecoa pulchra
 †Palaeohypotodus
 †Palaeohypotodus rutoti – or unidentified comparable form
  †Palaeophis
 †Palaeophis virginianus
 †Palaeorhaphis
 †Palaeorhaphis pergracilis
 Panopea
 †Panopea alabama
 †Panopea bellsensis
 †Panopea oblongata
 †Panopea porrectoides
 Panthera
  †Panthera onca
 †Papillina
 †Papillina altilis
 †Papillina cooperi
 †Papillina dumosa
 †Papillina mohri
 †Papillina papillata
 †Papillina staminea
 Paracyathus
 †Paracyathus bellus
 †Paracyathus cylindricus – type locality for species
 †Paracyathus granulosus – type locality for species
 †Paracyathus rugosus – type locality for species
 Paracypris
 †Paracypris franquesi
 Paracytheridea
 †Paracytheridea belhavenensis
 †Parmicorbula – or unidentified comparable form
 †Parmicorbula gibbosa
 Pasithea
 †Pasithea guttula
 †Pasithea striata
 †Pasitheola
 †Pasitheola claibornensis
 †Pasitheola guttula
 †Pasitheola tornatelloides
 †Patulaxis
 †Patulaxis scrobiculata
 Pecten
 †Pecten byramensis
 †Pecten howei
 †Pecten perlanus
 †Pecten perplanus
 †Pecten poulsoni
 †Pediomeryx
  Pekania
 †Pekania pennanti
  Pelecyora
 †Pelecyora hatchetigbeensis
 Penion
 †Penion bellus
 †Penion crebrissimus
 †Penion delabechii
 †Penion gracilis
 †Penion imbricatulus
 †Penion leai
 †Periarchus
 †Periarchus lyelli
 †Periarchus pileussinensis
 †Periarchus protuberans
 Perigastrella
 †Perigastrella costellifera
 †Perigastrella oscitans
 †Perigastrella ovoidea
 †Perigastrella plana
 †Perigastrella trapezoidea
 Periploma
 †Periploma butlerianum
 †Periploma claibornense
 †Periploma collardi
 †Periploma complicatum
 †Perissolax
 †Perissolax eocensis
 †Peristomella
 †Peristomella coccinea
 †Peristomella erecta – type locality for species
  Peromyscus
 Petricola
 †Petricola claibornensis
 Petrophyllia
 †Petrophyllia gardnerae – type locality for species
  Phalium
 †Phalium brevicostatum
 †Phalium taitii
 Philine
 †Philine alabamensis
 Pholadomya
 †Pholadomya claibornensis
  Pholas
 †Pholas alatoidea
 †Pholas aldrichi
  Phos
 †Phos iterandum
 †Phos lucrifactum – tentative report
 †Phos mangonizatum
 †Phos sagenum
 †Phos texanum
 Phyllodus
 Physodon
 †Physodon secundus
 Physoida
 †Physoida clarkeana
 Pica
  †Pica pica
 Picoides
   †Picoides villosus – or unidentified comparable form
 Pinna
  Pipistrellus
 Piranga
  †Piranga olivacea – or unidentified comparable form
  Pitar
 †Pitar cornelli
 †Pitar exiguus
 †Pitar juliae
 †Pitar macbeani
 †Pitar nuttali
 †Pitar nuttalliopsis
 †Pitar petropolitanus
 †Pitar poulsoni
 †Pitar ripleyanus
 †Pitar securiformis
 †Pitar texibrazus
 †Pitar trigoniata
 †Plagiarca
 †Plagiarca rhomboidella
 Plagiobrissus
 †Plagiobrissus dixie
 Plagioecia
 †Plagioecia birta – type locality for species
 †Plagioecia divagans – type locality for species
 †Plagioecia tubifer – type locality for species
 †Plagiosmittia
 †Plagiosmittia regularis
  †Planaria – report made of unidentified related form or using admittedly obsolete nomenclature
 †Planaria nitens
  Planorbis – or unidentified comparable form
 †Platyoptera
 †Platyoptera extenta
 Platytrochus
 †Platytrochus claibornensis
 †Platytrochus goldfussi
 †Platytrochus stokesi
 †Pleiolama
 †Pleiolama vera – or unidentified comparable form
 Plethodon
  †Plethodon glutinosus
 Pleurofusia
 †Pleurofusia claibarena
 †Pleurofusia collaris
 †Pleurofusia huppertzi
 †Pleuroliria
 †Pleuroliria subdeviata
 †Pleuroliria supramirifica
 †Pleuroliria tizis
 Pleuromeris
 †Pleuromeris inflatior
 †Pleuromeris parva
 †Pleuromeris tortidens
 †Pleuronea
 †Pleuronea alveolata
 †Pleuronea elevata
 †Pleuronea fenestrata
 †Pleuronea fibrosa
 †Pleuronea fusiformis
 †Pleurostoma
 †Pleurostoma adolescens
  Pleurotomaria – report made of unidentified related form or using admittedly obsolete nomenclature
 Pleurotomella
 †Pleurotomella whitfieldi
 †Plevrofusia – tentative report
 †Plevrofusia huppertzi
 Plicatula
 †Plicatula filamentosa
 Podilymbus
  †Podilymbus podiceps
  Poirieria
 †Poirieria harrisi
  Polinices
 †Polinices aratus
 †Polinices eminulus
 †Polinices onustus
 †Polinices weisbordi
 Polyschides
 †Polyschides turritus
 Pomatodelphis
 †Pomatodelphis inaequalis
 †Pontogeneus
 †Pontogeneus brachyspondylus
 Porella
 †Porella crassoparies – type locality for species
 †Porella crassoparites
 †Porella cylindrica – type locality for species
 †Porella erecta – type locality for species
 Porina
 †Porina saillans – type locality for species
  †Potamides – report made of unidentified related form or using admittedly obsolete nomenclature
 †Potamides fulvarupis
 †Priscoficus
 †Priscoficus juvenis
 †Priscoficus triserialis
  Pristis
 †Pristis lathami
 Proboscina
 †Proboscina clavatiramosa
 †Proboscina conveniens – type locality for species
 †Proboscina cranei – type locality for species
 †Proboscina latabrevis – type locality for species
 †Proboscina subechinata
  Propeamussium
 †Propeamussium alabamense
 †Propeamussium squamulum – or unidentified comparable form
 †Prosthennops
 †Prosthennops serus – or unidentified comparable form
 †Protocardia
  †Protohippus
 †Protohippus gidleyi
 †Protoscutella
 †Protoscutella mississipiensis
 †Protoscutella mississippiensis
 †Protosurcula
 †Protosurcula gabbii
  Prunum
 †Prunum columba
  Pseudemys
 †Pseudemys cocinna
  †Pseudolatirus
 †Pseudolatirus tortilis
 Pseudoliva
 †Pseudoliva forma
 †Pseudoliva nanafaliaensis
 †Pseudoliva perspectiva
 †Pseudoliva santander
 †Pseudoliva scalina
 †Pseudoliva tuberculifera
 †Pseudoliva unicarinata
 †Pseudoliva vetusta
 Pseudomalaxis
 †Pseudomalaxis rotella
 †Pseudomalaxis tipa
 †Pseudomalaxis verrilli
 Pseudoneptunea – or unidentified comparable form
 †Pseudoneptunea harrisi
 †Pseudophragmina
 †Pseudophragmina stephensoni
 Pteria
 †Pteria limula
 †Pteria vanwinkleae
 †Pteropsella
 †Pteropsella lapidosa
 †Pteropsella papyria
 †Pteropsella praelapidosa
 †Pterosphenus – type locality for genus
 †Pterosphenus schucherti – type locality for species
  Pterothrissus
 Pterynotus
 †Pterynotus matthewsensis
 Puellina
 †Puellina inarmata
 †Puellina radiata
 †Puellina simulator
  Pycnodonte
 †Pycnodonte johnsoni
 †Pycnodonte pulaskensis – or unidentified related form
 †Pycnodonte sylvaerupis
 †Pycnodonte trigonalis
 †Pycnodonte vicksburgensis
  Pyramidella
 †Pyramidella anita
 †Pyramidella bastropensis
 †Pyramidella chavani
 †Pyramidella cossmanni
 †Pyramidella dalli
 †Pyramidella mitchelliana
 †Pyramidella obtusoides
 †Pyramidella perexilis
 †Pyramidella propeacicula
 †Pyramidella pseudopymaea
 †Pyramimitra
 †Pyramimitra olssoni
 †Pyramimitra terebraeformis
 †Pyrgulina
 †Pyrgulina claibornensis

Q

 Quinqueloculina
 †Quinqueloculina hauerina – tentative report
 †Quinqueloculina jacksonensis
 Quiscalus
  †Quiscalus quiscula

R

 Raja
 †Rana
  †Rana catesbeiana
 †Rana pipiens
 †Ranellina
 †Ranellina sulcata
 Rangifer
  †Rangifer tarandus
 Raphitoma
 †Raphitoma georgei
 †Raphitoma pannekoekae
 †Raphitoma specus
 †Raphitoma veatchi
 †Raphitoma venusta
 †Rectonychocella
 †Rectonychocella tenuis – type locality for species
 †Recurvella
 †Recurvella dolabra
  Reithrodontomys
  Reteporella
 †Reteporella laciniosa
 †Reteporella lacintosa – type locality for species
  Retusa
 †Retusa galba
 †Retusa sylvaerupis
 †Rhabdopitaria
 †Rhabdopitaria discoidalis
 †Rhabdopitaria subcrassa
 †Rhagasostoma
 †Rhagasostoma levigata – type locality for species
 Rhamphostomella
 †Rhamphostomella simplex – type locality for species
  Rhinobatos
 Rhinoclavis
 †Rhinoclavis mediavia
  Rhinoptera
  Rhizoprionodon
 Rhizorus
 †Rhizorus conradianus
 †Rhizorus subradius
 †Rhizorus volutatus
 †Rhopostoma
 †Rhopostoma creniferum
 †Rhopostoma cruciferum
  Rhynchoconger
 †Rhynchoconger sanctus
 †Rhytisoria
 †Rhytisoria alabamensis
 Rimella
 †Rimella laqueatus
 †Ringicardium
 †Ringicardium harrisi
 Ringicula
 †Ringicula alabamensis
 †Ringicula biplicata
 †Ringicula butleriana
 †Ringicula claibornensis
 †Ringicula lisbonensis
 †Ringicula trapaquara
  Rissoina
 †Rissoina alabamenesis – tentative report
 †Rissoina alabamensis
 †Rissoina cossmanni
 †Rogueus
 †Rogueus johnsoni
 Rosseliana
 †Rosseliana parvipora
 Rostellaria
 †Rostellaria decisus
 †Rostellaria explicatus
 †Rostellaria mohri
 †Rostellaria ottonis
 †Rostellaria proscissus
 †Rostellaria quercollis
 †Rostellaria rannelloides
 †Rostellaria symmetricus
 †Rotularia
 †Rotularia mcglameryae
 †Rotularia mcglemeryae
 †Rudiscala
 †Rudiscala harrisi
 †Rudiscala sessilis

S

 †Sablea – tentative report
 Saccella
 †Saccella catasarca
 †Saccella parva
 †Saccella quercollis
 †Saccella robusta
 Salenia – tentative report
 Sassia
 †Sassia septemdentata
 Saxicavella
 †Saxicavella alabamensis
 †Saxolucina
 †Saxolucina claibornensis
 †Saxolucina gaufia
 Sayornis
  †Sayornis phoebe – or unidentified comparable form
 Scalaria – report made of unidentified related form or using admittedly obsolete nomenclature
 †Scalaria quinquefasciata
 Scalina
 †Scalina staminea
 †Scalina trapaquara
  Scaphander
 †Scaphander alabamensis
 †Scaphander ligniticus
 Scaphella
 †Scaphella newcombiana
 †Scaphella showalteri
 †Sceptrum
 †Sceptrum perulum
 †Schedocardia
 †Schedocardia hatchetigbeensis
  Schizaster
 †Schizaster americanus
 †Schizaster armiger
 †Schizemiella
 †Schizemiella claibornica
 Schizomavella
 †Schizomavella arborea – type locality for species
 †Schizomavella porosa
  Schizoporella
 †Schizoporella viminea
 †Schizorthosecos
 †Schizorthosecos grandiporosum – type locality for species
 †Schizorthosecos interstitia
 †Schizorthosecos radiatum
 †Scintilla
 †Scintilla alabamiensis
 †Scintilla clarkeana
 Scobinella
 †Scobinella elaborata
 †Scobinella hammettensis
 †Scobinella reticulatoides
 †Scobinella sativa
 †Scobinella sculpturata
 Scolopax
  †Scolopax minor
 Scrupocellaria
 †Scrupocellaria clausa
 †Scrupocellaria cookei
 †Scrupocellaria milneri
 †Scrupocellaria rathbuni – type locality for species
 †Scrupocellaria resneri – type locality for species
 †Scrupocellaria triangulata – type locality for species
 †Scrupocellaria vaughani – type locality for species
 †Scrupocellaria williardi
  Scyliorhinus
 †Scyliorhinus enniskilleni – type locality for species
  Seila
 †Seila constricta
 Semele
 †Semele langdoniana
 †Semele linosa
 †Semele monroensis
 †Semele profunda
 Semihaswellia
 †Semihaswellia exilis – type locality for species
  Serpula
 †Serpula adnata – tentative report
 Serpulorbis
 †Serpulorbis major
 †Serpulorbis squamulosus
  Siderastrea
 †Siderastrea conferta – type locality for species
 †Sideroseris
 †Sideroseris durhami
 Sigatica
 †Sigatica boettgeri
 †Sigatica clarkeana
 Sigmomorphina – tentative report
 †Sigmomorphina inequalis
  Sinum
 †Sinum arctatum
 †Sinum beatricae
 †Sinum bilix
 †Sinum declive
 †Sinum fiski
 †Sinum inconstans
  Siphonalia
 †Siphonalia newtonensis
 †Siphonalia perlata
 †Siphonalia quadrilineata
 Siphonochelus
 †Siphonochelus gracilis
 Skena
 †Skena pignus
 Skenea
 †Skenea pignus
   †Smilodon
 †Smilodon fatalis
 Smittina
 †Smittina ampla – type locality for species
 †Smittina angulata
 †Smittina cophia – type locality for species
 †Smittina coronata
 †Smittina exigua
 †Smittina granulosa – type locality for species
 †Smittina jacksonica
 †Smittina portentosa
 †Smittina pupa – type locality for species
 †Smittina reticuloides – type locality for species
 †Smittina telum – type locality for species
 †Smittina tubulata
 Smittipora
 †Smittipora tenuis
 Solariella
 †Solariella cancellata
 †Solariella fungina
 †Solariella louisiana
 †Solariella stalagmium
 †Solariella sylvaerupis
 †Solariella tricostata
 Solariorbis
 †Solariorbis depressus
 †Solariorbis liniferus
 †Solariorbis planulatus
 †Solariorbis rotulus
 †Solariorbis subangulatus
 †Solarium
 †Solarium periscelidum
  Solemya
 †Solemya alabamensis
 †Solemya petricoloides
 Solena
 †Solena lisbonensis
  Sorex
 Sphenotrochus
 †Sphenotrochus claibornensis – type locality for species
 †Sphenotrochus nanus
  Sphyraena – tentative report
  Sphyrna
 †Sphyrna gilmorei – type locality for species
 Spilogale – tentative report
  †Spilogale putorius
 †Spiratella
 †Spiratella augustana
 Spiroloculina
 †Spiroloculina bidentata
 Spirorbis
 †Spirorbula – tentative report
 Spisula
 †Spisula decisa
 †Spisula jacksonensis
 †Spisula parilis
 †Spisula praetenuis
  Spondylus
 †Spondylus dumosus
 †Spondylus hollisteri
 Sportella
 †Sportella alabamensis
 †Sportella gregorioi
 †Sportella oblonga
 †Stamenocella
 †Stamenocella grandis
 †Stamenocella inferaviculifera
 †Stamenocella intermedia – type locality for species
 †Stamenocella mediaviculifera
 †Stamenocella midwayanica
 †Stamenocella pyriformis
 †Steganoporella
 †Steganoporella vicksburgica
 Steginoporella
 †Steginoporella jacksonica
 Stenocyathus
 †Stephanomorpha – type locality for genus
 †Stephanomorpha monticuliformis – type locality for species
  Sterna
 Stomachetosella
 †Stomachetosella crassicollis
  Storeria
 †Strepsidura
 †Strepsidura contorea
 †Strepsidura heilprini
 †Strepsidura mediavia
 †Streptochetus
 †Streptochetus conybearii
 †Streptochetus limulus
 Striarca – or unidentified comparable form
 †Striarca harrisi
  †Striatolamia
 †Striatolamia macrota
 Strioturbonilla
 †Strioturbonilla harrisi
 Strix
  †Strix varia – or unidentified comparable form
 †Stromatopora
 †Stromatopora minuta – type locality for species
 †Stromatopora polygona
  Strombus
 †Strombus albirupianus
 Stylophora
 †Stylophora ponderosa
 †Sullivania
 †Sullivania exilloides
 †Sullivania fisherensis
 †Sullivania hicoricola
 †Sullivania roscoei
 †Sullivania tombigbeensis
 Surculites
 †Surculites engonatus
 †Surculoma
 †Surculoma calantica
 †Surculoma falsabenes
 †Surculoma fita
 †Surculoma nebulosa
 †Surculoma penrosei
 †Surculoma servatoidea
 †Surculoma subequalis
 †Surculoma tabulata
 Sveltella
 †Sveltella parva
 †Sveltella sotoensis
 †Sveltella turritissima
 Sveltia
 †Sveltia alveata
 †Sveltia gilberti
 †Sveltia priama
 †Sycospira
 †Sycospira americanae
 †Sycostoma
 †Sycostoma americanae
 Sylvilagus
   †Synthetoceras
 †Synthetoceras davisorum – type locality for species
 †Synthetoceras tricornatus – or unidentified comparable form

T

 †Tallahattaophis – type locality for genus
 †Tallahattaophis dunni – type locality for species
  Tapirus
 Teinostoma
 †Teinostoma angulare
 †Teinostoma subrotundum
   †Teleoceras
 †Teleosteorum – report made of unidentified related form or using admittedly obsolete nomenclature
  Tellina
 †Tellina aldrichi
 †Tellina alta
 †Tellina bellsiana
 †Tellina cossmanni
 †Tellina cynoglossa
 †Tellina cynoglossula
 †Tellina estellensis
 †Tellina greggi
 †Tellina leana
 †Tellina linifera
 †Tellina semipapyria
 †Tellina semirotunda
 †Tellina subtriangularis
 †Tellina tallicheti
 †Tellina temperata
 †Tellina trumani
  Temnocidaris – tentative report
  Tenagodus
 †Tenagodus vitis
 Tenarea – tentative report
 †Tenuiacteon
 †Tenuiacteon pertenuis
  Terebra
 †Terebra mirula
 †Terebra polygyra
 †Terebra texagyra
 †Terebra ziga
 Terebratulina
 †Terebratulina alabamensis
 †Terebratulina brundidgensis
 †Terebratulina lachryma
 †Terebrifusus
 †Terebrifusus – type locality for species A informal
 †Terebrifusus amoenus
 †Terebrifusus multiplicatus
 Teredo
 †Teredo ringens
 †Teredo simplex
 †Teredo simplexopsis
 †Textivenus
 †Textivenus retisculpta
  Textularia
 †Textularia cuyleri – or unidentified comparable form
 †Textularia dibollensis
 †Textularia hannai
 Thamnophis
  †Thamnophis sirtalis
 Thecidellina
 †Thecidellina alabamensis – type locality for species
  Thiara
 †Thiara aldrichi
 †Tibiella
 †Tibiella marshi
 †Tiburnus
 †Tiburnus eboreus
 †Tornatellaea
 †Tornatellaea bella
 †Tornatellaea lata
 †Tornatellaea quercollis
 Tornus
 †Tornus infraplicatus
 †Toulminella
 †Toulminella alabamensis
 †Toweius
 †Toweius petalosus – type locality for species
 †Trachichthyidarum – report made of unidentified related form or using admittedly obsolete nomenclature
 †Trachichthyidarum stringeri – type locality for species
 Trachyleberis
 †Trachyleberis davidwhitei
 †Trachyleberis montgomeryensis
 †Trachyleberis washburni
  Trachyphyllia
 †Transovula
 †Transovula regularoidea
 Trapezium
 †Trapezium claibornense
 Trichiurides
  Trichiurus
 †Triginglymus – type locality for genus
 †Triginglymus gnythophoreus
 †Triginglymus hyperochus – type locality for species
 †Trigonarca – report made of unidentified related form or using admittedly obsolete nomenclature
 †Trigonarca corbuloides
  Trigonostoma
 †Trigonostoma aurorae
 †Trigonostoma babylonicum
 †Trigonostoma gemmatum
 †Trigonostoma marieanum
 †Trigonostoma panones
 †Trigonostoma penrosei
 †Trigonostoma pulcherrimum
 †Trinacria
 †Trinacria cuneus
 Trionyx
 Triphora
 †Triphora distincta
 †Triphora major
 †Triphora similis
 †Tripia
 †Tripia anteatripla
 †Tritonatractus
 †Tritonatractus pearlensis
 Trochita
 †Trochita aperta
 Trochocyathus
 †Trochocyathus cingulatus – type locality for species
 †Trochocyathus lakii – type locality for species
 †Trochoseris
 †Trochoseris aperta
  Trochus – report made of unidentified related form or using admittedly obsolete nomenclature
 †Trochus gumus
  Trophon
 †Trophon caudatoides
 †Tropisurcula
 †Tropisurcula crenula – tentative report
 †Trypanotoma
 †Trypanotoma carlottae
 †Trypanotoma longispira
 †Trypanotoma melanella
 †Trypanotoma terebriformis
 †Trypanotopsis
 †Trypanotopsis texana
 Trypostega
 †Trypostega elongata – type locality for species
 †Trypostega inornata
 †Trypostega venusta
 Tubiola
 †Tubiola nautiloides
  Turbinella – or unidentified related form
 †Turbinolia
 †Turbinolia claibornensis – type locality for species
 †Turbinolia dickersoni – type locality for species
 †Turbinolia gigantissima – type locality for species
 †Turbinolia pharetra
 †Turbinolia subtercisa
 †Turbinolia tenuis – type locality for species
 †Turbinolia vicksburgensis
 Turbo – report made of unidentified related form or using admittedly obsolete nomenclature
 †Turbo zecus
 Turboella
 †Turboella ziga
  Turbonilla
 †Turbonilla agrestis
 †Turbonilla bidentata
 †Turbonilla clinensis
 †Turbonilla neglecta
 †Turbonilla pellegrina
 †Turbonilla sabina
 †Turbonilla tardiusculus
 †Turbonilla tuscahomensis
 Turdus
  †Turdus migratorius
 Turricula
 †Turricula aldreperta
 †Turricula nasuta
 †Turricula plenta
 †Turricula taltibia
  Turris
 †Turris adeona
 †Turris bimoniatus
 †Turris capax
 †Turris leania
 †Turris longipersa
 †Turris mediavia
 †Turris moniliata
 †Turris nodoideus
 †Turris persa
 †Turris quercollis
 †Turris sigma
 †Turris specus
   Turritella
 †Turritella aldrichi
 †Turritella apita
 †Turritella bellifera
 †Turritella carninata – or unidentified comparable form
 †Turritella claytonensis
 †Turritella dutexata
 †Turritella eurynome
 †Turritella gatunensis – or unidentified comparable form
 †Turritella ghigna
 †Turritella gilberti
 †Turritella hilli
 †Turritella houstonia
 †Turritella humerosa
 †Turritella levicunea
 †Turritella lisbonensis
 †Turritella multilira
 †Turritella nasuta
 †Turritella nerinexa
 †Turritella obruta
 †Turritella postmortoni
 †Turritella praecincta
 †Turritella tennesseensis
  Tylocidaris
 †Tylocidaris salina – type locality for species
 Tympanuchus
  †Tympanuchus cupido

U

 Umbonula
 †Umbonula ceratomorpha
 †Umbonula miser
 Umbraculum
 †Umbraculum sylvaerupis
 Uromitra
 †Uromitra gracilis
 †Uromitra terplicata
 Ursus
  †Ursus americanus

V

 Venericardia
 †Venericardia apodensata
 †Venericardia aposmithi
 †Venericardia aposmithii
 †Venericardia augustoscrobis
 †Venericardia bashiplata
 †Venericardia carolinensis
 †Venericardia claiboplata
 †Venericardia claviger
 †Venericardia complexicosta
 †Venericardia cookei
 †Venericardia densata
 †Venericardia diversidentata
 †Venericardia gulielmi
 †Venericardia hatcheplata
 †Venericardia horatiana
 †Venericardia mediaplata
 †Venericardia nanaplata
 †Venericardia pilsbryi
 †Venericardia planicosta
 †Venericardia rotunda
 †Venericardia smithii
 †Venericardia stewarti
 †Venericardia tortidens
 †Venericardia turneri
 Verticordia
 †Verticordia eocensis
 †Verticordia sotoensis
 Vincularia
 †Vincularia vicksburgia – type locality for species
  Vitrinella
 †Vitrinella aldrichi
 †Vokesula
 †Vokesula aldrichi
 †Vokesula smithvillensis
 †Volutilithes
 †Volutilithes clarae
 †Volutilithes florencis
 †Volutilithes limopsis
 †Volutilithes rugatus
 †Volvaria
 †Volvaria alabamiensis
 †Volvariella
 †Volvariella aldrichi

W

 †Weisbordella
 †Weisbordella johnsoni
 †Wythella

X

 Xanthilites
 †Xanthilites alabamensis
 Xenophora
 Xestoleberis
  Xylophaga
 †Xylophaga mississippiensis

Y

 Yoldia
 †Yoldia eborea
 †Yoldia pistorupes
 †Yoldia semenoides

Z

 †Zeugmatolepas
 †Zeugmatolepas cretae – or unidentified comparable form
  †Zygorhiza
 †Zygorhiza kochii – type locality for species

References
 

Cenozoic
Alabama